The Women's National Basketball League (WNBL) is a women's basketball league in England, covering semi-professional and amateur levels of the game.  This is effectively seen as the second tier of women's basketball in the United Kingdom, along with the less celebrated Scottish Women's National League.

The EBL was established in 2003 by Basketball England to replace the former National Basketball League, which the league has since reverted to at the start of the 2015/2016 season, and currently operates three women's leagues in a regionalised structure, as well as the men's National Basketball League.  The senior leagues are supported by a junior structure for both male and female players, with leagues for under-18s, under-16s and under-14s.

The NBL Leagues form the second and third level of women's competition in the United Kingdom, with the highest level consisting of the semi-professional Women's British Basketball League.  There is no promotion and relegation between the National League and the Women's British Basketball League, which operates a franchise system, although teams seeking greater competition and exposure can apply to make the step from NBL to the WBBL.

History
When it was founded in 2003, the women's EBL consisted of two levels of competition; a nationalized Division 1, closely matching the WNBL Conference which existed under the previous structure, and a regionalized Division 2, originally split into North and South conferences.  At this point, there was no level of competition above Division 1, nor any competition for clubs on a British level.  From the 2007/2008 season onwards, Division 2 was split into three regions to allow for the greater number of clubs applying for national competition.

In 2014, England Basketball and the British Basketball League collaborated to form the Women's British Basketball League, which absorbed many of the largest women's clubs in the NBL, including the whole of Division 1.  As a result, the most established and successful clubs in women's basketball in the United Kingdom are no longer part of the NBL.  Initially, the NBL's women's leagues retained the original regionalised structure of the old Division 2, which meant only the end-of-season playoffs offering the opportunity for clubs from across the whole of England to compete against each other.  A nationalised Division 1 was reinstated for the 2016/2017 season, with the new Division 2 split across a North/South divide.

Teams
WNBL Division 1 League for the 2020/2021 season.

Division 1

WNBL Division 2 League for the 2020/2021 Season.

Division 2

League Champions

Playoff Champions

References

External links
Official site of Basketball England, including the EBL National League
English Women's Basketball League at eurobasket.com

Women
Women's basketball in England
England
Sports leagues established in 2003
Basketball